Step dance is a generic term for dance styles in which footwork is considered to be the most important part of the dance and limb movements and styling are either restricted or considered irrelevant.

Step dancing includes clog dancing in which the steps are performed by performers wearing clogs. The sound of the clogs against a hard surface produces a characteristic sound which is an important element of the dance.

Irish stepdance is a widespread form of step dance. The earliest feis, or competition, occurred in 1897. It descends from traditional Irish dance, but global popularity of the Riverdance troupe significantly altered its competitive form from traditional Irish standards. Both traditional and more modern competitive styles are characterized by the use of specific shoes and by costumes that can be remarkably elaborate. Irish stepdance is, as of 2017, the only form of step dance to which a Broadway production, Lord of the Dance, has been devoted.

Tap dancing is a modern form of step dancing taking its influence from a variety of older step-forms.

A traditional form of individual step dancing is still found in certain areas of England such as East Anglia and Dartmoor. This style of dance is commonly performed informally in pubs to traditional folk tunes, with dancers often bringing a wooden board to dance on.

Step dancing ("stomping") can also be found in other countries such as Malambo from Argentina and Zapateado from Mexico.

Another form of step dancing, stepping, has been popularized by National Pan-Hellenic Council. This step dance has African roots and is an African American tradition as well as part of black history. The members of the fraternities and sororities join in steps—elaborate synchronized group routines that are performed in competitions between the fraternities and sororities called "step shows". Step shows incorporate cheerleading, military, and drill-team moves, especially the call-and-response element inherent in those forms. These aspects are not only important to the energy of stepping for entertainment use but also for bonding and pride within their organizations.

See also
Canadian stepdance
Dabke
Jig
Showtime Steppers

References

Tap dance
African-American dance
European folk dances
National Pan-Hellenic Council
Irish dance
Body percussion
Uses of shoes
Articles containing video clips

hr:Step
pt:Sapateado
sv:Steppdans